Dangri is a village located in Rajouri district of Jammu region in the Indian union territory of Jammu and Kashmir.

The village is the site of the 2023 Rajouri attacks.

References

Villages in Rajouri district